John Philip McCarthy  (born 29 November 1942) is a former Australian diplomat.

Biography
Born in Washington, D.C., McCarthy was educated at Downside School, Somerset, in England and studied at Jesus College, Cambridge. He received a Master of Arts and a Bachelor of Laws degree from Cambridge University. He was a barrister-at-law and practised in London from 1965 to 1967. He worked with the New York City Law Firm of Shearman & Sterling from 1966 to 1967 and joined the Department of External Affairs in Canberra in 1968.

McCarthy was senior private secretary to the Australian Minister for Foreign Affairs, Andrew Peacock, between December 1978 and November 1980. Peacock later succeeded McCarthy as Australian Ambassador to the United States in 1997.

McCarthy served as Australia's representative in the following posts:

 Ambassador to Vietnam (1981–83) 
 Ambassador to Mexico (1985–87) 
 Ambassador to Thailand (1992–94) 
 Ambassador to the United States (1995 to 1997) 
 Ambassador to Indonesia (1997-2001)
  Ambassador to Japan (2001 – 2004)
 High Commissioner to India (2004-2009).

He also served in diplomatic posts in Damascus, Baghdad and Vientiane.

McCarthy was appointed an Officer of the Order for Australia in 1999 for service to the enhancement of Australia's international reputation and to the development of Australian regional policy while serving as Australia's Ambassador to Indonesia in Jakarta.

Personal
McCarthy has two daughters with ex-wife Zorica McCarthy.

Honors
 Order of the Rising Sun, 2nd Class, Gold and Silver Star (2020)

References

Ambassadors of Australia to the United States
Ambassadors of Australia to Vietnam
Ambassadors of Australia to Mexico
Ambassadors of Australia to Thailand
Ambassadors of Australia to Indonesia
Ambassadors of Australia to Japan
Ambassadors of Australia to Syria
1942 births
Living people
High Commissioners of Australia to India
Ambassadors of Australia to Bhutan
People from Washington, D.C.
Alumni of Jesus College, Cambridge
Officers of the Order of Australia
Recipients of the Order of the Rising Sun, 2nd class